Charaxes boueti, the bamboo charaxes, is a butterfly in the family Nymphalidae. It is found in Senegal, Gambia, Guinea-Bissau, Guinea, Burkina Faso, Sierra Leone, Liberia, Ivory Coast, Ghana, Togo, Nigeria, Cameroon, Bioko, Gabon, the Republic of the Congo, the Central African Republic, Angola, the Democratic Republic of the Congo, Sudan, Ethiopia and Uganda. The habitat consists of forests, woodland and savanna.

The larvae feed on Arundinaria alpinus, Oxytenanthera abyssinica, Bambusa vulgaris and Afzelia species.

Description

The underside of the forewing is white or silvery at the costal margin to the end of the cell 
and the hindwing beneath hasa nearly straight silvery median band, only 2–3 mm. in breadth. The transverse markings of the under surface are reddish, as in the other species of this group, and only black in cellule 1 b of the forewing. The base of both wings above more or less broadly red-yellow or red-brown. The females with light yellow median band. The hindwing with two well developed tails.Ch. boueti is distinguished by a material reduction of the black markings  on the upper surface. In the male the basal part of the forewing above is only separated by a row of free black spots from the broad, concolorous median band and the marginal spots also only by a nearly straight row of thick, lunulate, black spots from the median band. In cellules 3—7 of the forewing the median band is divided into two by black spots.  In boueti Feisth. the spots which divide the median band in cellules 3—7 are united into a band; the transverse streaks in the basal part of cellule 2 on the underside of the forewing are black; the female is unknown. In Senegambia and the interior of Sierra Leone.— In rectans Rothsch. and Jord. (male) the marginal spots of the throwing are larger and the marginal band of the hindwing narrower than in the type-form. Forewing beneath with a silvery transverse band beyond the middle. Abyssinia.
A full description is also given by Walter Rothschild and Karl Jordan, 1900 Novitates Zoologicae Volume 7:287-524.  page 408 et seq. (for terms see Novitates Zoologicae Volume 5:545-601 )

Taxonomy
Charaxes cynthia group

The group members are:
Charaxes cynthia similar to Charaxes lucretius
Charaxes protoclea
Charaxes boueti close to next
Charaxes lasti close to last
Charaxes alticola

Related to Charaxes cynthia, Charaxes macclounii and Charaxes lasti

Subspecies
Charaxes boueti boueti (Senegal, Gambia, Guinea-Bissau, Guinea, Burkina Faso, Sierra Leone, Liberia, Ivory Coast, Ghana, Togo, Nigeria (south), Cameroon (west), Equatorial Guinea (Bioko), Gabon, Congo, Central African Republic, western Democratic Republic of the Congo)
Charaxes boueti carvalhoi Bivar de Sousa, 1983  (north-western Angola)
Charaxes boueti rectans Rothschild & Jordan, 1903 (southern Sudan, south-western Ethiopia, northern Uganda)

References

Seitz, A. Die Gross-Schmetterlinge der Erde 13: Die Afrikanischen Tagfalter. Plate XIII 31
Victor Gurney Logan Van Someren, 1970 Revisional notes on African Charaxes (Lepidoptera: Nymphalidae). Part VI. Bulletin of the British Museum (Natural History) (Entomology)197-250.

External links
Images of C. boueti boueti Royal Museum for Central Africa (Albertine Rift Project)
Charaxes rectans images at Consortium for the Barcode of Life
Charaxes boueti images at Consortium for the Barcode of Life
Charaxes boueti rectans images at BOLD
African Butterfly Database Range map via search

Butterflies described in 1878
boueti
Butterflies of Africa